Calvinet is a former commune in the Cantal department in south-central France. On 1 January 2019, it was merged into the new commune Puycapel.

Population

See also
Communes of the Cantal department

References

Former communes of Cantal
Cantal communes articles needing translation from French Wikipedia
Populated places disestablished in 2019